The Modular Sniper Rifle, or MSR, is a bolt-action sniper rifle developed and produced by Remington Arms for the United States Army. It was introduced in 2009, and was designed to meet specific United States Army and USSOCOM Precision Sniper Rifle requirements. The MSR initially won the PSR competition, and was called the Remington Mk 21 Precision Sniper Rifle in U.S. military service. However, it was then decided that the Mk 21 did not conform to SOCOM requirements at the time in 2018, and the program was re-competed with the Barrett MRAD selected in 2019 as the Mk 22 Advanced Sniper Rifle solution.

History
On 7 March 2013, MSR was declared the winner of the Precision Sniper Rifle competition.  Remington announced that the MSR had won on March 8, and it was publicly confirmed on March 9.  This was followed by a $79.7 million contract for 5,150 rifles with suppressors, along with 4,696,800 rounds of ammunition to be supplied over the next ten years. The contract was awarded on 12 September 2013.  Remington Defense produces the sniper rifles and utilizes two other companies for other system components, with Barnes Bullets for ammunition and Advanced Armament Corporation for muzzle brakes and suppressors; all three companies are subsidiaries of Freedom Group Incorporated.

In 2015, the U.S. Army was considering the PSR to replace both the .300 Winchester Magnum M2010 Enhanced Sniper Rifle and the .50 BMG M107 Long Range Sniper Rifle for regular snipers, although no decision has been made. The U.S. Marine Corps was also considering the Mk 21 to replace their M40A5 sniper rifle, but is unlikely to adopt the Mk 21 due to the higher cost of the system, particularly the ammunition, as compared to the 7.62mm NATO M40A5.

Design
The Remington MSR is a manually operated bolt-action weapon with a rotary locking bolt. To facilitate caliber change, the bolt is equipped with removable bolt heads, with bolt faces matched for appropriate calibers. Bolt heads have three radial locking lugs. The MSR rifle is built upon an aluminum alloy "chassis", which hosts a compact receiver, adjustable trigger unit, pistol grip, and fully adjustable side-folding buttstock. The quick-change barrels are free-floated inside the tubular handguard which is provided with a number of user-installable Picatinny type accessory rails. The top of the receiver also is fitted with a monolithic Picatinny rail used to install sighting equipment (telescope sights or night vision sights). Additional equipment includes a detachable folding bipod and a quick-detachable suppressor which installs over the specially designed muzzle brake.

The model that won the PSR competition is a modified version of the original MSR. It can be chambered in 7.62×51mm NATO, .300 Winchester Magnum, and .338 Lapua Magnum.

Changes to the PSR version include:
 Reinforced AAC muzzle brake for Titan QD suppressor
 Chromoly steel .338 barrel with 1:9.5 twist, 5R rifling, and Melonite (ferritic nitrocarburized) finish
 One piece handguard with 20 MOA top rail
 Barrel nut accessible without removing the handguard
 X-treme trigger
 Light weight, removable buttstock with throw lever adjustments instead of ratcheting adjustments

Users

 : Algerian Special Forces.
 : Special Operations Command (Brazil).
 : Colombian Special Forces.
 : French Army
 : "Metzada" take-over unit of the Israel Prison Service.
 : Italian Armed Forces
 : Special Forces of México against drug trafficking.
 : Used by Underwater Offence (Turkish Armed Forces), Gendarmerie General Command and Special Forces Command (Turkey).
 : USSOCOM, first winner of the Precision Sniper Rifle competition, later excluded due to non-compliance

See also
 Precision Sniper Rifle

References

.338 firearms
Sniper rifles of the United States
Remington Arms firearms
Bolt-action rifles of the United States
Modular firearms
Military equipment introduced in the 2000s